Slavchev Toshev  (born 13 June 1960) is a former Bulgarian footballer.

Club career
He played mainly for Bulgarian football clubs, as well as for Yukong Elephant of South Korea in 1993.

References

External links
 

1960 births
Living people
Bulgarian footballers
K League 1 players
Jeju United FC players
Bulgarian expatriate footballers
Bulgarian expatriate sportspeople in South Korea
Expatriate footballers in South Korea
Association football goalkeepers